"29 Palms" is a rock song by English musician Robert Plant. It is included on his 1993 album Fate of Nations. The songwriting credited to Plant, Charlie Jones and Doug Boyle (two of the backing musicians on the recording), Chris Blackwell and Phil Johnstone.

A review in Billboard magazine described "29 Palms" as "richly emotive rock with strong, spell-casting power" and notes Plant's vocal and the guitars and percussion. Released as a single, it became his second most successful single on the UK Singles Chart, where it reached number 21.

Lyrics
In a 1993 interview, Plant would not discuss the song, except to say "'29 Palms' was written on tour, the last time we were in California."  Twentynine Palms, California, is a small town located in the Mojave Desert about 140 miles east of Los Angeles. It is best known as one of the main entry ways to the Joshua Tree National Park and the site of one of the largest Marine Corps training bases in the US.

The song includes the refrain:

B-sides 
The CD single featured three non-album songs, "21 Years" and "Dark Moon", both written and performed with singer-songwriter Rainer Ptacek, and a version of "Whole Lotta Love (You Need Love)", also performed with Ptacek.

Personnel
Billboards single review notes "[v]ibrant electro-acoustic guitars" and "a percussive grandeur that includes skillful use of snare, tom-toms, and timpani". The musicians are:
Robert Plantvocal
Kevin Scott MacMichaelguitar
Doug Boyleguitar
Charlie Jonesbass
Chris Hughesdrums

Chart performance

References

External links

1993 songs
Songs written by Robert Plant
Robert Plant songs
Song recordings produced by Chris Hughes (record producer)